Hold On is the third single from the Jamaican recording artist Sean Paul's fifth studio album Tomahawk Technique. It was written by Pierre "The Maven" Medor, Rico Love and Sean Paul Henriques and was produced by Pierre "The Maven" Medor, Rico Love. The song has charted in France.

Hold On is widely associated with Usain Bolt in his endeavour to victory in the London 2012 Olympic Games in the 100m and 200m races.

Music video
A Lyric music video to accompany the release of "Hold On" was first released onto YouTube on 21 February 2012 at a total length of four minutes and nine seconds.

Credits and personnel
 Lead vocals – Sean Paul
 Producers – Pierre "The Maven" Medor, Rico Love
 Lyrics – Pierre "The Maven" Medor, Rico Love, Sean Paul Henriques
 Label: Atlantic

Chart performance

References

2012 singles
Sean Paul songs
Songs written by Sean Paul
Songs written by Rico Love
Songs written by Pierre Medor
2011 songs
Atlantic Records singles